Ana Toni is a non-profit director, consultant, and grantmaker. She currently serves as the executive director of the Brazil-based non-profit organisation Instituto Clima e Sociedade (iCS) [Institute for Climate and Society].

She is a partner in the consulting company Public Interest Management.  Toni served as the first Executive Director of ActionAid Brazil, and was the Ford Foundation's representative in Brazil in the 2000s.  From 2010 to 2017 she was the Chair of the Board of Greenpeace International and serves on the board of the new Baobá Fund for Racial Equity. In July 2013 Toni was appointed to the board of trustees of the Wikimedia Foundation and left it in August the next year. She lives in Rio de Janeiro.

Background
Toni studied Economic and Social Studies at Swansea University, and earned a master's degree in Politics of the World Economy at the London School of Economics.

In 1993 she joined Greenpeace, as the International Head of the political unit in Amsterdam, and later as senior advisor to Greenpeace Germany.  There she helped develop the first Greenpeace initiatives in the Amazon region.  From 2000 to 2003 she served as board member of Greenpeace Brazil.

In 1998 she became the first Executive Director of ActionAid Brazil, focusing on community development projects and public policy campaigns.  She also supported local social investment in Brazil, as a board member of the Brazilian social investment association GIFE.

In 2003 she became the Ford Foundation's representative in Brazil, supporting projects addressing human rights, land rights, discrimination, development, and public media.

References

External links 

Living people
Alumni of the London School of Economics
Alumni of Swansea University
People associated with Greenpeace
Year of birth missing (living people)
Non-profit executives
Wikimedia Foundation Board of Trustees members